Gršković's fragment of the Acts of the Apostles represents one of the oldest preserved monuments written in Glagolitic script in Old Slavic language, in which features of the Serbian vernacular appear under the influence of which later developed Serbian recension of Church Slavonic. It is considered, based on some features of the language (e.g. replacing the letter "f" with the letter "p", i.e. "Ste" "p" "an" instead of "Ste" "f" "an") and the Glagolitic alphabet itself, that it was created at the end of 11th century or at the beginning of the 12th century on the territory of Bosnia or Zeta or Zahumlje.

It is written in Glagolitic transitional type, between Macedonian and Croatian.

The passage itself consists of four sheets of parchment measuring 15.5 × 21.7 cm, on which the part Acts of the Apostles is written, facing east ( orthodox) rite and is related, in terms of the place and time of origin, the so-called Mihanović's fragment.

Fragments were found at the end of the 19th-century by Priest Jerko Gršković in Vrbnik on Krk and according to him these fragments got its name. They are kept in the archive of the Croatian Academy of Sciences and Arts.

See also 
 List of Glagolitic manuscripts
 Gospel of Mary

References 

Medieval Serbian texts